Djinga is a genus of flowering plants belonging to the family Podostemaceae.

Its native range is Western Central Tropical Africa.

Species:

Djinga cheekii 
Djinga felicis

References

Podostemaceae
Malpighiales genera